His Honour Sir Lawrence John Verney, TD, DL (19 July 1924 – 25 July 2014) was a British judge. He was Recorder of London from 1990 to 1998.

References 

 https://www.ukwhoswho.com/view/10.1093/ww/9780199540891.001.0001/ww-9780199540884-e-41075
 https://www.buckinghamtoday.co.uk/news/obituaries/tributes-paid-judge-who-spared-rolling-stone-jail-2630551

1924 births
2014 deaths
Recorders of London
Deputy Lieutenants
20th-century English judges